Xiao Hu Dui (Chinese: 小虎隊), also known as the Little Tigers, were a Taiwanese boy band formed in 1988. The band consisted of Alec Su, Nicky Wu and Julian Chen. The trio rose to fame during the late 1980s, achieving success in their native Taiwan and throughout Asia. Their success led to the recognition, popularity and creation of Taiwanese idol boy bands and other pop acts. Xiao Hu Dui are cited as the first idol band. After a brief hiatus, the group disbanded in 1995. The three members went on to pursue solo careers. They sold over 15 million albums.

In 2010, Xiao Hu Dui briefly reunited, performing for CCTV's Spring Festival Gala. In March 2016, Su and Chen both attended Wu's wedding in Bali.

Musical career

1988: Formation
In the late 1980s, due to the rise in popularity of campus folk songs amongst the Taiwanese society, members of the local music circles and scouts began looking for potential new faces, and Chinese pop music became active.

In July 1988, Zhonghua TV Company launched Zhang Xiaoyan’s talent show “TV Rookie Hegemony Station”, which consisted of three girls’ “Kit Team” as program assistants. In order to achieve balance, Kaili Creative Portfolio Brokers looked to select three boys as assistants. In the end, 18-year-old Nicky Wu, 17-year-old Chen Zhipeng and 15-year-old Alec Su stood out amongst the candidates. The group consisting of these three was named "Little Tigers". At the time, Wu was a sports student studying in Taichung. He had a judo and a Taekwondo foundation. The iconic movement was a clean and backward backflip, and the nickname was "霹雳虎". Chen studied ballet, has music and dance foundation, which is similar to Hong Kong star Leslie Cheung. He is known as "Little Shuai Tiger". Su was the youngest performer. He was a high school student at the prestigious Taipei Municipal Jianguo High School. At the end of 1988, the Little Tigers signed a contract with UFO Group.

1989–1992: The first active period
The original positioning of the Little Tigers was based on the imitation of the Japanese idols around that time, most specifically, Shonentai. The combination of the best fast songs and dynamic dances, the first single "Green Apple Paradise" was also adapted from Shonentai's song. During the New Year in 1989, the Little Tigers teamed up with the women’s group of the same company to release the album Happy New Year, and Green Apple Paradise was also included. The vibrant image of the Little Tigers quickly gained popularity among young people. The Little Tigers, which was originally a supporting role, developed independently.

1994–1995: The second active period
At the end of 1993, Chen Zhipeng retired from the army, and the Little Tigers held the "Stars are still brilliant" song club, and the release of the stars is still brilliant. At this time, the ecology of Taiwan's entertainment industry has changed, the wave of idol groups has gradually receded, and individual idols have emerged in an endless stream. The members also began to profess their preference to develop their solo careers. In 1994 and 1995, the group released two albums, "The feeling of happiness is always the same" and "The mediocrity of the mediocrity". In the spring and fall of 1995, the Little Tigers held a number of "Tiger Screaming Dragons 95 Concerts" in Taiwan, Singapore, and China. During this period, UFO Group and major shareholder Warner Music had a disagreement, resulting in the resignation of the UFO team, and in 1996 UFO Group was acquired by Warner Music. As a result of the personnel change, the three members were now contracted to different companies, leading to the official disbandment of the group.

Members

Works

Discography

Film
遊俠兒 (1990)

Other

Advertising
SYM Motors (1989)

See also
 Forever Friends – a 1995 film featuring Wu and Su. The Little Tigers disbanded after the film.
 My Fair Princess (season 1) – a 1998 TV series reuniting Su and Chen.
TFBoys

References

External links
Nicky Wu – Sina Weibo 
Julian Chen – Sina Weibo 
Alec Su – Sina Weibo 

Musical groups established in 1989
Mandopop musical groups
Taiwanese boy bands
Taiwanese idols